The 2022 Jersey general election was held on June 22 to elect the 49 members of the States Assembly.

Timeline
In March 2021, it was announced the election could be held in June, rather than as regular in May, to minimise the impact of the four bank holidays which would fall during the election campaign period otherwise. 

The election purdah period began on 10 May 2022, limiting the activities of the Council of Ministers to business as usual activities.

Electoral system

The 2022 elections are the first to be held under a new electoral system. Under the system, the role of Senators is abolished and replaced with 37 Deputies elected across 9 districts via plurality block voting. The election of one Connétable from each of the twelve parishes is maintained.

This election has seen the debut of many new political parties to a political landscape that has been traditional dominated by independent candidates. Before the election the newly formed centre-right Jersey Alliance, which included the previous Chief Minister John Le Fondré, had led the previous Government of Jersey. The centre-right Liberal Conservatives and the centrist Progress Party entered into a political pact with one other for the election. The existing social-democratic Reform Jersey party will also contest the election, and a group of independent candidates will stand with a shared platform and agreed principles under the name of ‘Better Way’, including Chief Scrutineer and Senator Kristina Moore.

For the 2022 elections, the Constable of St. Martin brought forward an amendment to include "the choice of ‘None of the Above’ to be automatically included as a ballot option in any States Assembly election where the number of candidates in a District or Parish does not exceed the number of seats available, with an appropriate formal consequence being provided should this ballot option achieve a plurality of the votes cast." The change was subsequently approved by the States Assembly.

Political parties and groups

The table below lists the parties or groups that nominated at least one candidate for the election:

Notes

Overall results

Notes 
As the electorate can vote for more than one candidate, including voting for multiple candidates of differing political parties, the vote total is not indicative of the popular vote share of each party but rather the total amount of votes each candidate received.

The 'Better Way' group ran as independents and are not a registered political party nor stood as a political party. Their candidates received 8,016 votes and 4 out of 5 of their candidates were elected.

Results

Connétable election candidates

Deputy election candidates 

* The Better Way is an initiative started to support independent candidates and their individual manifestos. It is not a political party.

References

Elections in Jersey
2022 in Jersey
Jersey
Jersey